Vincent River may refer to:

 Vincent River, a water course now known as French Creek
 Vincent River (play), a play by Philip Ridley, that premiered in 2000